McMahon, also spelt MacMahon, is a surname of Irish origin. It is derived from the Gaelic Mac Mathghamhna meaning 'son of the bear'.

The surname came into use around the 11th century and is used by two different Irish clans, also known as septs: The MacMahons of Thomond (County Clare) from Mid-West of the Republic of Ireland and the MacMahons of Oriel (County Monaghan) from North of the Republic of Ireland.

The MacMahons of Thomond (County Clare)

The Thomond MacMahons were part of the great tribal grouping, the Dál gCais, and claimed descent from Mahon O'Brien, son of Muirchertach Ua Briain, High King of Ireland. Corcu Baiscin was held by the descendants of Carbry Bascain until the 11th Century, when the descendants of Mahon O’Brien conquered them.

According to Frost, Mahone 'a quo MacMahon' died in 1129, leaving two sons Murtagh and Dermot, with Murtagh being the ancestor of the main line of McMahons in Clare. The McMahons seized the Corcabaskin territory in the south of what is now County Clare in the 12th century about the same time as they adopted the fixed surname.

Quoting the "Annals of the Four Masters", Frost says that Donogh MacMahon, Lord of Corcabaskin, died in 1488 and two MacMahons, Brian and Teige Roe, were established in his place – Brian in West Corcabaskin (known as Moyarta) and Teige Roe in the East (known as Clonderalaw). The two ruling branches of the clan became firmly established in Corcabaskin, West Clare, where their once strongholds, Carrigaholt Castle and Clonderlaw Castle, are prominent landmarks and a source of local interest today.

In August 1585, the Irish leaders of Thomond were forced to sign an Indenture with Sir John Perrott, the English Lord Deputy of Ireland. Frost says that "some of the signatories of the Deed of Composition seem to have been bribed into conformity by Perrott", including Teige MacMahon ... of Clonderalaw and Turlough MacMahon of Moyarta. They were allowed to retain their castles and lands free of crown rent. The two MacMahons would have received the English titles of Baronet, replacing their traditional Irish titles, about this time. The two sons who succeeded them as heads of their families certainly each carried the English title.
  
The last chief of the West Corcabaskin MacMahons, Sir Teige Caech MacMahon, was killed at or shortly after the battle of Kinsale in 1602, and his title became extinct.

Sir Turlough Roe MacMahon, Baronet of East Corcabaskin, received the honour of becoming High Sheriff of County Clare in 1609. He died in 1629. According to an Inquisition held at Ennis in 1630 (reported in Frost's "History ... of Clare"), Turlough's title was inherited by his eldest son, Sir Teige MacMahon. Sir Teige (or Teague) represented the Earl of Thomond in negotiations with Sir William Penn in 1646, but in 1651 General Ireton seized Clonderlaw Castle from Sir Teige. Frost's "History" records 31 Townlands in County Clare being seized from Sir Teague. James Barry's "The Cromwellian Settlement of the County of Limerick" mentions Sir Teague MacMahon as the holder of other lands in that County.

There is evidence that Sir Teague had a son called Turlough (or Terlagh). Honour, Lady Dowager of Kerry and Lixnaw, was granted the "guardianship and tuition of Torlogh MacMahon, son and heir to Teague MacMahon" on 27 June 1673 (recorded in MS Carte 38, fol(s) 742v (Carte Caleb=ndar Vol 52, 1673–1674, Bodleian Library, Uni of Oxford). Ainsworth's edited Inchiquin Manuscripts, MS No 1845, at p. 625, contains a note made following the death of Mary Rua O'Brien in 1686 which refers to "her nephew Sir Terlagh McMahon". The title appears to have died out with him.

After the defeats of the native Irish in the 17th century, many of the Clare MacMahons emigrated to serve in the Irish Brigade of the French Army.

Patrice de MacMahon (1808–1893), was created Duke of Magenta, became a field marshal and later the French president. The MacMahon family are still prominent in France; the family home is the Château de Sully outside Dijon.

Motto
The motto of the Thomond sept of McMahons is "Sic Nos Sic Sacra Tuemur", which means "Thus We Defend Our Sacred Rights” being Protectors of Church properties owned by the Kings of Thomond being the O'Brien Clan. The McMahon Clan is directly descended from legendary General and High King of Ireland Brian Boromie "Conquorer of the Danes at Clontarf". As are the O'Briens, who the McMahons have fought and married for 1,000 years.

The MacMahons of Oriel (Monaghan)

Motto
In the old Irish orthography, the Oriel MacMahon motto is "So Dorn Dona Dhubhfuillibh" and "So Dorn Dona Dhubhfuiltish" in reformed. 
The motto was originally a battle cry and means "Here's a fist to the dark-blooded".

History
The MacMahons of Oriel are a sept, or sub-clan of Clann Nadsluaigh. They trace descent from The Three Collas to their patronymic namesake, Niall Mac Mathghamhna, who descended from Mathgamna, Lord of the ancient kingdom of Fernmaige, located in the modern Baroney of Farney. They ruled the kingdom of Oriel (Anglicisation of Airgíalla) from 1243 to 1590 C.E. The Airgíalla Kingship was ended when Rossa Buidhe MacMahon, found himself in a geopolitically untenable position of his kingdom wedged between an expanding Tudor Kingdom of Ireland and Tír Eoghain under the O'Neill. Rossa Buidhe agreed to surrender and regrant his territories to the English Crown in Ireland and they became County Monaghan in the Kingdom of Ireland. The county was subdivided into five baronies with Farney, Cremorne, Dartrey, and Monaghan controlled by MacMahons and Truagh by McKennas.

The MacMahons lost control of Monaghan after the Irish Rebellion of 1641. Led by Colla Mac O'brian MacMahon, the MacMahons rose in revolt with O'Neill and other Ulster clans in an attempt to seize Dublin Castle and overthrow the English Tudor kingdom. While the plot to capture Dublin Castle failed, the McMahons captured Castleblaney and Carrickmacross in Monaghan. However, the English defeated the Irish uprising and Monaghan land was passed to Protestant settlers.

It was a MacMahon, Colonel Hugh Oge's loose lips that were responsible for letting slip the plot to seize Dublin Castle. He had drunkenly told his Protestant foster brother Owen Connolly, who subsequently betrayed him and he was captured. With the help of two priests and a Scottish maid, Hugh Oge escaped from the Tower of London by sawing through his bars on 18 August 1644. However, he was recaptured 5 weeks later. He was convicted of treason and beheaded in London on 22 November 1644.

John O'Hart also noted that the early MacMahons (sometimes called O'Mahons) were chiefs of the over-kingdom of Ulaid, which bordered Airgíalla.

Chieftains 
 Neill mac Mathgamhna mac Mathgamna ?-? (Ladrannaibh, or the bandit), (early 12th century)
 Eochaid mac Mathgahamna mac Neill, died 1273
 Brian mac Eochada, 1283–1311
 Ralph/Roolb mac Eochada, 1311–1314
 Mael Sechlainn mac Eochada, 1314–?
 Murchad Mór mac Briain, ?–1331
 Seoan mac Maoilsheachlainn, 1331–1342
 Aodh mac Roolb, 1342–1344
 Murchadh Óg mac Murchada, 1344–1344
 Maghnus mac Eochadha, 1344–1357
 Pilib mac Rooilbh, 1357–1362
 Brian Mór mac Aodh, 1362–1365
 Niall mac Murchadha, 1365–1368
 Brian Mór mac Aodh, 1368–1371
 Pilib Ruadh mac Briain, 1371–1403
 Ardghal mac Briain, 1403–February 1416
 Brian mac Ardghail, 1416–1442
 Ruaidhri mac Ardghail, 1442–1446
 Aodh Ruadh mac Ruaidhri, 1446–31 March 1453
 Feidhlimidh mac Briain, 1453–1466
 Eochan mac Ruaidhri, 1466–1467
 Reamonn mac Ruaidhri, 1467–November 1484
 Aodh Óg mac Aodha Ruaidh, 1485–16 September 1496
 Brian mac Reamoinn, 1496–1497
 Rossa mac Maghnusa, 1497–1513
 Reamonn mac Glaisne, 1513–c.1 April 1521
 Glaisne Óg mac Reamoinn, 1521–1551?
 Art Maol mac Reamoinn, 1551–1560
 Aodh mac Briain, 1560–1562
 Art Ruadh mac Briain, 1562–1578
 Sir Rossa Buidhe mac Airt, 1579–August 1589
 Hugh Roe McMahon (Irish: Aodh Ruadh mac Airt), 1589–September/October 1590.
 Brian Mac Hugh Og of the Dartrey MacMahons (late 16th century)

Sourced from:
 MacMahons of Oriel: Mac Mathghamna, Kings of Oirghialla to 1590, in A New History of Ireland, pp. 215–16, volume IX, ed. Byrne, Martin, Moody. Dublin, 1984
 (II) The "Airgialla Charter Poem", Ailbhe Mac Shamhrain and Paul Byrne, in The Kingship and Landscape of Tara, Edel Bhreathnach, pp. 213–224, edited Edel Bhreathnach, Four Courts Press, Dublin, 2005

Branch chieftains
Raymond McMahon of the Killyleen Mc Mahons (late 17th century)
Nicholas McMahon of the Cluaincoinin Mc Mahons (early 19th century)
Patrick McMahon of the Cluaincoinin Mc Mahons (late 19th century)
Martin McMahon [Motto] of the Cluaincoinin Mc Mahons (early 20th century)
John McMahon [Jack Martin] of the Cluaincoinin Mc Mahons (late 20th century)

The McMahons of Fermanagh
A separate McMahon family in County Fermanagh is descended from Mahon Maguire, a grandson of Donn Carrach Maguire.

People 
McMahon or MacMahon is the family name of the following people:

Arts
 Aline MacMahon (1899–1991), American actress
 Andrew McMahon (born 1982), American singer-songwriter
 Andrew "Blueblood" McMahon (1926–1984), American Chicago blues bass guitarist, singer and songwriter[
 Bernard MacMahon (filmmaker), British filmmaker
 Bryan MacMahon (writer) (1909–1998), Irish playwright, novelist and short story writer
 Charles MacMahon (disambiguation), several people:
Charles MacMahon (politician) (1824–1891), Australian MP and police commissioner
Charles MacMahon (theatre) (1861–1917), Australian theatrical entrepreneur and filmmaker
 Ciarán Mac Mathúna (1925–2009), Irish broadcaster
 Éabha McMahon (born 1992), Irish singer
 Ed McMahon (1923–2009), American entertainer 
 Ella McMahon, British singer (better known as Ella Eyre)
 Geraldine McMahon, British-Irish harpist and singer 
 Gerard McMahon, English singer-songwriter 
 Ivor McMahon (1924–1972), English violinist
 Jennifer McMahon (writer) (born 1968), American novelist
 Julian McMahon (born 1968), Australian actor; son of former Prime Minister
 Kevin McMahon (musician) (born 1953), American industrial rock musician
 Mike McMahon (comics) (born 1954), British comics illustrator
 Ryan McMahon (singer-songwriter) (born 1979), Canadian singer-songwriter, folk-rock musician
 Ryan McMahon, aka Iame (rapper) (also known as Wool See), American hip-hop recording artist
 Sonia McMahon, Lady McMahon (1932–2010), Australian socialite; wife of former Prime Minister
 Tony MacMahon (born 1939), Irish button accordion player and radio and television broadcaster

Politics and nobility
 Amy MacMahon, Australian politician
 Brien McMahon, American lawyer and politician
 Sir Henry McMahon (diplomat) (1862–1949), British soldier and High Commissioner in Egypt
 Jim McMahon (politician) (born 1980), British Member of Parliament
 Michael MacMahon (politician) (1854–1931), Australian politician
 Michael McMahon (born 1957), American politician and attorney
 Michael McMahon (Scottish politician) (born 1961), Scottish politician
 The MacMahon family of French aristocrats.
 Patrice de MacMahon (1808–1893), president of France 1873–1879
 Sam McMahon, Australian politician
 Sir William McMahon "Billy McMahon" (1908–1988), prime minister of Australia 1971–1972

Religion
 Bernard MacMahon (bishop) (1680–1747), Irish bishop
 Bernard MacMahon (Irish bishop), Irish Bishop
 Heber MacMahon (16001650), Irish bishop and general
 Hugh MacMahon (1660–1737), Irish bishop
 Michael Peter MacMahon (1720–1807), Irish Dominican friar
 Séamus mac Pilib Mac Mathghamhna (died 1519), Bishop of Derry
 William Ponsonby McMahon (1852–1933) Australian Catholic newspaperman

Science and medicine 
 Brian MacMahon (1923–2007), British-American epidemiologist
 James McMahon (astronomer), contemporary American amateur astronomer
 James McMahon (mathematician) (1856–1922), Irish mathematician
 Jennifer McMahon (nutritionist), New Zealand nurse and nutritionist
 Lee E. McMahon (1931–1989), American computer scientist
 Mike McMahon (professor), English surgeon
 Percy Alexander MacMahon (1854–1929), British soldier and mathematician
 Theresa McMahon (1878–1961), American economist
 Thomas A. McMahon (1943–1999), American professor of applied mechanics and biology, novelist

Sports 
 A. McMahon, alias of Arnold Horween, American football player for Harvard Crimson and in the NFL
 Bill McMahon, former Hong Kong international lawn bowler
 Brent McMahon (wheelchair racer) (Michael Brent McMahon, born 1966), Canadian Paralympic athlete
 Brian McMahon (rowing) (born 1961), Canadian coxswain
 Brigitte McMahon (born 1967), Swiss triathlete
 Daryl McMahon, Irish footballer
 Doc McMahon (1886–1929), Major League Baseball pitcher
 Don McMahon (1930–1987), Major League Baseball pitcher
 Eagle Wynne McMahon (born 1998), American professional disc golfer
 Eddie McMahon, Scottish footballer
 Jim McMahon (born 1959), American football player
 Joe McMahon, Tyrone Gaelic footballer
 John McMahon (cricketer), Australian-born cricketer who played in England
 Justin McMahon, Tyrone Gaelic footballer
 Kevin McMahon (athlete) (born 1972), American hammer thrower
 Matt McMahon (basketball) (born 1978), American college basketball coach
 Michael McMahon (rugby union) (1889–c. 1961), Australian rugby union player
 Mike McMahon (disambiguation), multiple persons
 Mike McMahon (American football) (born 1979), American football player
 Mike McMahon (Australian rules footballer) (1902–1962), Australian rules footballer
 Mike McMahon Sr. (1915–1974), Canadian ice hockey player
 Mike McMahon Jr. (1941–2013), his son, Canadian ice hockey player
 Pat McMahon (coach) (born 1953), American baseball coach
 Philip McMahon (1896–1997), Dublin Gaelic Footballer
 Ralph McMahon, alias of Ralph Horween, American football player for Harvard Crimson
 Ross McMahon, footballer (Burnley FC)
 Ryan McMahon (baseball), (born 1994), Major League Baseball infielder
 Sadie McMahon (1867–1964), Major League Baseball pitcher
 Sean McMahon (born 1994), Australian rugby union player
 Seánie McMahon, Clare hurler
 Sharelle McMahon, Australian netballer
 Sophie MacMahon, Irish cricketer
 Steve McMahon (footballer) (born 1961), English footballer (Liverpool FC)
 Tony McMahon, footballer (Middlesbrough FC)
 Trevor McMahon (born 1929), New Zealand Test cricketer

Others
Bernard F. McMahon, United States Navy submarine commander of World War II
Bryan MacMahon (judge) (born 1941), Irish judge
Norman McMahon (1866–1914), British Army general

Wrestling 
The McMahon family of WWE fame:
Jess McMahon (1882–1954), boxing and wrestling promoter; founder of Capitol Wrestling Corporation
 Vincent J. McMahon (1914–1984), wrestling promoter; founder of WWE's immediate predecessor company, the World Wide Wrestling Federation
 Vince McMahon (born 1945), former chairman and CEO of World Wrestling Entertainment, Inc. (dba WWE, Inc.)
 Linda McMahon (born 1948), wife of Vince Jr., former CEO of WWE and former administrator of the Small Business Administration.
 Shane McMahon (born 1970), son of Vince Jr. and former Executive President of WWE Global Media
 Stephanie McMahon (born 1976), daughter of Vince Jr., chairwoman and co-CEO of WWE
Triple H (born 1969), ring name of Paul Levesque; husband of Stephanie, Chief Content Officer and Executive Vice President of Talent Relations of WWE, former professional wrestler

Ships of the surname
 was an oil tanker converted by the British for World War II service as a merchant aircraft carrier or MAC ship, that is an escort carrier for anti-submarine warfare, an anti-submarine warfare carrier.

See also 
 McMahan
 McMahen
 McMann
 McMahon, Saskatchewan, hamlet in Canada
 McMahon Stadium in Calgary, Alberta, Canada
 The McMahon Act or the Atomic Energy Act of 1946
 McMahon-Hussein Correspondence, exchange of letters during World War I concerning the fate of the Middle East
 McMahon system tournament, tournament pairing system invented for Go competitions
 An electorate area of Australia, NSW
 Mathgamain mac Cennétig

Macmahon Holdings, an Australian infrastructure and mining company.

Mahon (disambiguation)
Marquis de MacMahon d'Eguilly, Duke of Magenta
MacMahon Master theorem

References

Irish families
Surnames of Irish origin
Anglicised Irish-language surnames
English-language surnames
Ulaid

de:McMahon